G-Tower (Korean: G타워) is a 33-floor,  skyscraper currently completed. Inside there are international organizations, restaurants, banks and a post office. The city can be viewed from its 33rd floor, which is open for the public. The tower is popular with foreigners as most of the international organizations especially United Nations offices are located in the building.

References

Skyscrapers in Incheon